The Estádio Regional Willie Davids is a stadium in Maringá, Brazil. It has a capacity of some 20,000 spectators.  It is the home of Grêmio Maringá and Maringá FC.

References

Football venues in Paraná (state)
Maringá